Shahzad or Shehzad is a given name and surname. The name is made from شاه (Shah, "king"), and زاد (Zad, "son of"), so the name means "son of the king".

Notable persons with the name include:

Surname:
 Ahmed Shehzad, Pakistani cricketer
 Ajmal Shahzad (born 1985), an English cricketer
 Faisal Shahzad (born 1979), Pakistani-American convicted in 2010 Times Square bomb attempt
 Khurram Shahzad, Pakistani weightlifter
 Mohammad Shahzad (born 1991), Afghan cricketer
 Muhammad Shehzad (born 2004), Pakistani cricketer
 Rameez Shahzad (born 1987), United Arab Emirati cricketer
 Syed Saleem Shahzad, Pakistani journalist
 Shahzad Sidhu, Pakistani singer
Given name:

 Shehzad Tanweer, British Islamic terrorist and perpetrator of the 7/7 attacks
 Shazad Latif, British actor
 Shahzad Ukani, Ugandan cricketer.

See also
 Shahzade (disambiguation)
 Shah
 Şehzade

Persian-language surnames
Persian masculine given names